Charles James January (February 1, 1888 – April 26, 1970) was an American amateur soccer player who competed in the 1904 Summer Olympics. He died in Hidalgo County, Texas. In 1904 he was a member of the Christian Brothers College team, which won the silver medal in the soccer tournament. He played all four matches as a midfielder. His older brothers John and Thomas were also members of the silver medal winning team. His daughter, Lois, was an actress.

References

External links
profile

1888 births
1970 deaths
American soccer players
Footballers at the 1904 Summer Olympics
Olympic silver medalists for the United States in soccer
Medalists at the 1904 Summer Olympics
Association football midfielders
Christian Brothers Cadets men's soccer players